Paul Sabu (born January 2, 1960) is an American singer, songwriter, producer, and guitarist. He is the son of Indian-born film star Sabu and American actress Marilyn Cooper.

Career
He first burst onto the music scene in the late 1970s, as a writer, producer and performer of Disco hits. He scored big club hits with Ann-Margret, Debbie Jacobs and Sister Power featuring Gwen Jonae. However, Sabu is best known for his work with his band Only Child plus collaborations with a long list of artists including Lee Aaron, David Bowie, Little Caesar, Alice Cooper, Jesse Damon, Elvira, Fatal Smile, Madonna, Malice, Motels, The Nelsons, Robbie Neville, Prince, Silent Rage, Tattoo Rodeo, Teri Tims, Throne of Vengeance, Shania Twain, John Waite, and many more.

He is also well known for his music featured in movies and TV series soundtracks and has been credited with production/mixing on 14 Platinum and 11 Gold Records.
 2004 Kerrang Magazine voted Paul Sabu Top 5 favorite AOR vocalists of All Time.
 2005 Only Child's self-titled debut album from 1989 voted No. 22 on the Best AOR Albums of All Time.
 2011 Classic Rock Magazine awarded Paul Sabu the highest rated AOR Album of All Time.

Discography

Official releases
Sabu: Ocean/Ariola Records (1979).
Sabu: MCA Records (1980).
Kidd Glove: Motown (1984), also re-released (with bonus material) at Yesterrock.
Heartbreak: Heavy Metal America (1985), also re-released (with bonus material) at Z Records.
Only Child: Rhino/Capital (1988), also re-released (with bonus material) at Yesterrock.
Paul Sabu: Zero (1994), also re-released (with bonus material) at Z Records as "In Dreams".
Sabu: USG Records (1996).
Between the Light: USG Records (1998).
Strange Messiah: AOR Heaven (2007).
High & Mighty: AOR Heaven (2009).
Call of the Wild: Z Records (2011).
Bangkok Rules: Z Records (2012).
Banshee: Frontiers Music SRL (2022).

Album / song producer and contributor credits
Alexa - Alexa (1989) 
Alice Cooper - Hey Stoopid (1991), Spark In The Dark: The Best Of (2009)
Ann-Margret - Ann-Margret (1980)
AOR - L.A. Temptation (2012), L.A. Connection (2014), Return To L.A. (2015), L.A. Darkness (2016)
David Bowie - Dance (1985) 
Dennis Churchill Dries - I (AOR Heaven, 2015) 
Fatal Smile - World Domination (2008) 
Glass Tiger - Don't Forget Me (When I'm Gone) (1986)
Heart - Heart (1985)
Jesse Damon - The Hand That Rocks (2003), Rebel Within (2006)
John Waite - Ignition (1982)
Kelsey Lu - Blood (Sony Records, 2019)
Kim Carnes - Crazy In The Night (1990)
Lee Aaron - Bodyrock (1989), Some Girls Do (1991), The Best Of (1997)
Little America - Little America (1987), Fairgrounds (1989)
Little Caesar - Little Caesar (1990)
Malice - Crazy In The Night (1989)
Motels, The - Vacancy: Best Of (1990)
Paul Sabu  - Kidd Glove (1984), Heartbreak (1985), Only Child (1988), Paul Sabu (1994), Sabu (1996), Between The Light (1998), Strange Messiah (2008), High & Mighty (2009), Call Of The Wild (2011), Bangkok Rules (2012)
Quiet Riot - Quiet Riot 10 (RSM, 2014)
Robbie Nevil - Wot's It To Ya (1986), Wot's It To Ya: The Best of Robbie Nevil (1999)
(Eilleen) Shania Twain - Beginnings (1988), Final Beginnings (1991)
Secret Society - Induction (AMG Sony, 2018) 
Silent Rage - Shattered Hearts (1987), Don't Touch Me There (1989) 
Special EFX - Frontline (1986) 
Tattoo Rodeo - Rode Hard Put Away Wet (1991)
Teri Tims - Teri Tims (2014) 
THEM - Manor Of The Se7en Gables (SPV/Steam Hammer, 2018) 
Throne of Vengeance - Flesh Engine (2011), Live Evil (2013) 
Vapors, The - Turning Japanese (1980)
VA - Elvira Presents Monster Hits (1994), Elvira Presents Revenge of the Monster Hits (1995), Hard Rock Zombies Soundtrack (2008)
W.A.S.P. - Live...In the Raw (1987)

Music in film and TV credits
Accused, The (1988)
Baywatch (2001)
Beverly Hills 90210 (3 Seasons)
Child's Wish, A (1997)
Ghost Town (1988)
Ghoulies II (1987)
"Hard Rock Zombies" (1985)
Kids In The Hall, The (2010)
Meatballs 4 (1992)
New Mickey Mouse Club, The (1993)
Million Dollar Mystery (1987)
Music Is Communication (1986)
New WKRP in Cincinnati, The (1991-1993)
Real Men (1987)
Reason For Living (1990)
Sex and the City, Season 4 (2001)
To Die For (1995)
Twin Sitters (1995)
Vice Squad (1982)
Vice Versa (1988)
Kindred: The Embraced (1996)

References

External links
 Official Website
 Paul Sabu on iTunes

American male singers of Indian descent
American male singers
American record producers
Living people
1951 births
Place of birth missing (living people)